The flag of the state of São Paulo, Brazil, serves as one of the state's symbols, along with the state's coat of arms and anthem. It was designed by the philologist and writer Júlio Ribeiro in 1888, with his brother-in-law, Amador Amaral, a graphic artist. The flag has thirteen black and white stripes and a red rectangle in the upper left corner holding a white circle enclosing an outline map of Brazil in blue. There is a yellow star in each corner of the red rectangle.

Originally intended for the entire country, the flag became the de facto symbol of the state of São Paulo after the constitutionalist revolution of 1932, but was only adopted officially in 1946 after the new federal constitution gave the states and municipalities the right to create their own symbols of flags, seals/coats of arms.

History
In the last years 1870s and 1880s of the Empire of Brazil (1822-1889), many supporters of a republic created different designs for a national flag to be adopted for the new republic. For most of them, it was necessary to eliminate all the symbols that represented the imperial monarchy and the monarchic institutions. The republican writer and journalist Júlio Ribeiro, founder and editor of the newspaper "O Rebate", published in its first edition on July 16, 1888, a series of criticisms of the green and yellow (gold) imperial standard. He also presented his own idea for a republican flag. According to him, his design:

This flag was hoisted above the governor's palace in São Paulo on November15th, 1889, to celebrate the first days of the new republic. However four days later, on November19, 1889, under Decree No.4 of the Provisional Government, Brazil officially adopted a different flag, one designed by Raimundo Teixeira Mendes and with similar colors to the previous imperial one of seven decades.

Ribeiro's design then came over the subsequent decades to be considered the "flag of São Paulo". It was used to decorate building facades or as a decorative object but without any official status. It became a de facto symbol of the state of São Paulo after the 1932 Revolution in the early years of the Vargas Era in Brazil, during which President Getúlio Vargas had suspended the use of state symbols, including the flag of São Paulo. The flag finally achieved official status on November 27, 1946, under Decree-Law 16.349 of the new federal constitution, which gave the states the right to provincial symbols such as flags, colors, seals, coats of arms and logos.

However, Ribeiro's flag did not escape criticism. Afonso d'Escragnolle Taunay wrote of it in 1931, before the flag had received official recognition:

Characteristics

Legal description: dimensions and construction

The exact description of the flag is given by Article2 of law no.145 of 1948, still in force:

Article number 2. The making of the Flag of the State of São Paulo will obey the following norms, as shown graphically in annex 2:
I – To calculate the dimensions, the desired width shall be taken as the base, divided into thirteen equal parts, each part constituting a unit;
II – The length shall be 19.5 (nineteen and a half) units, the other elements having the following proportions:
a) Stripes: 1 (one) unit width for each stripe;
b) Canton: 7.5 (seven and a half) unit of length by 5 (five) units wide;
c) Circle: 4 (four) units in diameter;
d) Geographic silhouette: Inscribed in an imaginary circle of 3.5 (three and a half) units in diameter and concentric to the Circle.
e) Stars: Inscribed in an imaginary circle of 1.5 (one and a half) units in diameter, whose center is located 1 (one) unit away from the edges of the canton.
III – The indication of gold and silver metals, in any fabric in which the flag is made, shall be made by yellow and white, respectively.

Colors
The colors used in the flag (black, white, blue, yellow and red) do not have precisely-defined shades in the law. However, the manual of visual identity of the government of the state of São Paulo specifies the following colors:<ref name="Cores">SÃO PAULO. Manual de Identidade Visual, Governo de São Paulo  Acessado em: 19 jan. 2011.</ref>

Because of the flag, the colors that symbolize the state of São Paulo are black, red and white.

Meaning
The flag has thirteen stripes alternating between black and white, representing the days and nights that the bandeirantes fought for the good of the state. The top and bottom stripes are both black, so the edges are clearly delimited.

The canton consists of a red rectangle on the upper left corner, representing the blood shed by the bandeirantes. The white circle contains an outline of Brazil in blue, the color of strength, which the bandeirantes brought to the state. There is a yellow star on the inside of each corner of the rectangle.

On the reverse flag, the only difference is that the rectangle is aligned on the top-right; the outline of Brazil stays the same as on the obverse.

According to the flag's creator, Júlio Ribeiro, writing in O Rebate on July16, 1888, the red, black and white colors symbolize, respectively, the three constituent races of the Brazilian people: amerindians, blacks and whites. This references a theory advanced by Carl Friedrich Philipp von Martius who wrote Como se deve escrever a história do Brasil (1840). Von Martius's theory of three races also influences the design of other Brazilian flags, such as the state of Maranhão. Again according to Ribeiro in O Rebate, the four yellow stars represent the Southern Cross.

Related flags

See also
 
 Brasão do estado de São Paulo
 Nossa Bandeira
 Bandeira da cidade de São Paulo
 Revolução Constitucionalista de 1932

References

Bibliography
 Federici, Hilton. Símbolos Paulistas:'' estudo histórico-heráldico. São Paulo: Secretaria de Cultura, Comissão de Geografia e História, 1981.
 Compilação de "Símbolos Paulistas" – Biblioteca do Governo do Estado de São Paulo

External links

 Bandeira
 A história dos símbolos paulistas, O Estadão de S. Paulo

São Paulo (state)
São Paulo (state)
São Paulo (state)
1946 establishments in Brazil